Frank Strong (1859–1934) was the third president of the University of Oregon from 1899 to 1902 and sixth Chancellor of the University of Kansas from 1902 to 1920.

Strong was born on August 5, 1859, in Venice Center, New York, a son of Mary Foote and John Butler Strong. He graduated from the Yale Law School and between 1886–88 was a lawyer in Kansas City. He left his law practice to become principal of a high school in St Joseph, Missouri. Here he met Mary Evelyn Ransom; they married on June 24, 1890, and raised two children. In 1892 he became superintendent of the Lincoln, Nebraska school district.

Strong then returned to Yale University to obtain a Ph.D in 1897 with his dissertation Cromwell's colonial and foreign policy, with special reference to the West Indies expedition of 1654-5. There he received the John Addison Porter Prize and was lecturer in United States history from 1897-1899. Strong wrote some works on the colonial history of the United States. Subsequently, president of the University of Oregon from 1899 to 1902, he went to the University of Kansas next.  Strong stormed onto campus declaring that KU was woefully inadequate and that much more money was needed. In return, KU would graduate students capable of solving the state's economic and industrial problems, he said. He won increased funding and founded the schools of education, journalism and medicine and expanded extension programs. Four more buildings were completed before he resigned to teach law.

Strong died at his home in Lawrence, Kansas on August 6, 1934, the day after his 75th birthday. He is interred at the Fort Hill Cemetery in Auburn, New York. Strong Hall on the University of Kansas campus in Lawrence is named after Chancellor Strong.  The building is on the National Register of Historic Places and contains offices, classrooms, and an auditorium.

Bibliography
Frank Strong (1898) Benjamin Franklin: A Character Sketch, University Association Press
Frank Strong (1899) A Forgotten Danger of the New England Colonies, in the Annual Report of the American Historical Association, U.S. Government Printing Office, pp 77–138.
Frank Strong (1899)  The Causes of Cromwell's West Indian Expedition, The American Historical Review Vol. 4, 1899, Pages 228–245.
Frank Strong and Joseph Shafer (1901) Government of the American People, Houghton, Mifflin & Co., Boston and New York

References

1859 births
1934 deaths
19th-century American educators
20th-century American educators
19th-century American historians
19th-century American male writers
Chancellors of the University of Kansas
Presidents of the University of Oregon
Educators from New York (state)
People from Cayuga County, New York
Yale Law School alumni
Yale University alumni
American male non-fiction writers
Historians from New York (state)